Sanhe is a town under the administration of Jiangyou City in northern Sichuan province, China, located on the eastern (left) bank of the Fu River opposite  downtown Jiangyou. , it has eight residential communities and 19 villages under its administration.

References

Township-level divisions of Sichuan
Jiangyou